Harry Potter and the Goblet of Fire is a fantasy novel written by British author J. K. Rowling and the fourth novel in the Harry Potter series. It follows Harry Potter, a wizard in his fourth year at Hogwarts School of Witchcraft and Wizardry, and the mystery surrounding the entry of Harry's name into the Triwizard Tournament, in which he is forced to compete.

The book was published in the United Kingdom by Bloomsbury and in the United States by Scholastic. In both countries, the release date was 8 July 2000. This was the first time a book in the series was published in both countries at the same time. The novel won a Hugo Award, the only Harry Potter novel to do so, in 2001. The book was adapted into a film, released worldwide on 18 November 2005, and a video game by Electronic Arts.

Plot

Over the summer, the Weasleys invite Harry Potter to attend the Quidditch World Cup final, played between Bulgaria and Ireland. The match ends in a victory for the Irish, but the campsite is attacked by Voldemort's former followers called the Death Eaters. Despite no one being killed, the Death Eaters set off the Dark Mark to cause a panic.

Hogwarts reopens and a new tournament is announced between three schools to compete for the Triwizard Cup. The other competing schools are Beauxbatons and Durmstrang. Students excitedly await the start of the Tournament, which is declared open after the visiting teams arrive. The Goblet of Fire, a magical object tasked with selecting the champions, is unveiled. It names three champions from each of the schools, then selects Harry as a fourth champion, despite him being underage.

The students perceive Harry has cheated and turn on him. Rubeus Hagrid believes Harry's innocence and shows him the dragons involved in the First Task. Harry alerts Cedric Diggory, son of Amos Diggory, to the challenge and is helped by "Mad-Eye" Moody, ex-Auror and the new Defence Against the Dark Arts teacher, to prepare for the task. Using his superior flying skills, Harry gets past the dragon and retrieves a clue for the next task. The Second Task requires saving a close friend or relative from the lake. Harry uses Gillyweed, given to him by Dobby, to breathe underwater. He rescues Ron from the lake, while also saving the Beauxbatons champion, Fleur Delacour's sister, to pick up additional points.

A Yule Ball is announced and Harry must find a partner, as champions traditionally commence the opening dance. Harry and Ron Weasley struggle initially to get partners, but end up going with the "prettiest girls in their year" - Parvati and Padma Patil. Ron gets jealous seeing Hermione Granger with Viktor Krum, the Durmstrang champion, and spends the night arguing with her. Harry is sullen that Cho Chang is with Cedric, the other Hogwarts champion.

The Quidditch field is prepared for the Third (and final) Task, and requires champions to overcome a maze filled with obstacles. Harry and Cedric succeed in reaching the centre, where the Triwizard Cup is placed. They touch it together, but are transported outside Hogwarts to a graveyard. Cedric believes this is part of the Task, but Harry gets alerted when his scar starts burning wildly. Wormtail arrives with Voldemort and kills Cedric with the latter's wand. He then uses Harry's blood to restore a frail Voldemort back to his full, physical body. Voldemort summons his Death Eaters and tries to kill Harry in front of them. He fails when his and Harry's wandstreams connect, in a rare phenomenon, called Priori Incantatem. This causes a distraction, allowing Harry to escape back to Hogwarts using the Cup.

At Hogwarts, Moody pulls Harry into his office to question him and Harry realises that he is a Death Eater. He is saved by the arrival of Dumbledore, McGonagall and Snape, who force Moody to reveal himself to be Barty Crouch Jr, a Death Eater formerly presumed dead. Crouch Jr had imprisoned the real Moody and impersonated him using Polyjuice Potion. Arriving at Hogwarts, he makes sure Harry wins the Tournament and is transported to the graveyard for Voldemort's ritual. 

Crouch Jr is handed over to the Dementors. Harry recovers in the hospital wing, surrounded by Ron, Hermione and the Weasleys. He meets with Cedric's grieving parents, while Dumbledore makes plans to prepare the wizarding world for Voldemort's return. The school year ends and Harry returns to live with the Dursleys again for the summer.

Development
Harry Potter and the Goblet of Fire is the fourth book in the Harry Potter series. The first, Harry Potter and the Philosopher's Stone, was published by Bloomsbury on 26 June 1997. The second, Harry Potter and the Chamber of Secrets, was published on 2 July 1998. The third, Harry Potter and the Prisoner of Azkaban, followed on 8 July 1999. Goblet of Fire is almost twice the size of the first three books (the paperback edition was 636 pages). Rowling stated that she "knew from the beginning it would be the biggest of the first four." She said there needed to be a "proper run-up" for the conclusion and rushing the "complex plot" could confuse readers. She also stated that "everything is on a bigger scale," which was symbolic, as Harry's horizons widened both literally and metaphorically as he grew up. She also wanted to explore more of the magical world.

Until the official title's announcement on 27 June 2000, the book was called by its working title, 'Harry Potter IV.' Previously, in April, the publisher had listed it as Harry Potter and the Doomspell Tournament. However, J. K. Rowling expressed her indecision about the title in an Entertainment Weekly interview.
"I changed my mind twice on what [the title] was. The working title had got out — Harry Potter and the Doomspell Tournament. Then I changed Doomspell to Triwizard Tournament. Then I was teetering between Goblet of Fire and Triwizard Tournament. In the end, I preferred Goblet of Fire because it's got that kind of cup of destiny feel about it, which is the theme of the book."

Rowling mentioned that she originally wrote a Weasley relative named Malfalda, who, according to Rowling, "was the daughter of the 'second cousin who's a stockbroker' mentioned in Philosopher's Stone. This stockbroker had been very rude to Mr. and Mrs. Weasley in the past, but now he and his (Muggle) wife had inconveniently produced a witch, they came back to the Weasleys asking for their help in introducing her to wizarding society before she starts at Hogwarts." Malfalda was supposed to be a Slytherin and was to fill in the Rita Skeeter subplot, but she was eventually removed because "there were obvious limitations to what an eleven year old closeted at school could discover." Rowling considered Rita Skeeter to be "much more flexible." Rowling also admitted that the fourth book was the most difficult to write at the time because she noticed a giant plot hole halfway through writing.

Themes
Jeff Jensen, who interviewed Rowling for Entertainment Weekly in 2000, pointed out that bigotry is a big theme in the Harry Potter novels and Goblet of Fire in particular. He mentioned how Voldemort and his followers are prejudiced against Muggles and how, in Goblet of Fire, Hermione forms a group to liberate Hogwarts' house-elves who have "been indentured servants so long they lack desire for anything else." When asked why she explored this theme, Rowling replied,

She also commented that she did not feel this was too "heavy" for children, as it was one of those things that a "huge number of children at that age start to think about."

Publication and reception

UK/US release
Goblet of Fire was the first book in the Harry Potter series to be released in the United States on the same date as the United Kingdom, on 8 July 2000, strategically on a Saturday so children did not have to worry about school conflicting with buying the book. It had a combined first-printing of over five million copies. It was given a record-breaking print run of 3.9 million. Three million copies of the book were sold over the first weekend in the US alone. FedEx dispatched more than 9,000 trucks and 100 planes to fulfil book deliveries. The pressure in editing caused a mistake which shows Harry's father emerging first from Voldemort's wand; however, as confirmed in Prisoner of Azkaban, James died first, so then Harry's mother ought to have come out first. This was corrected in later editions.

Launch publicity
To publicise the book, a special train named Hogwarts Express was organised by Bloomsbury, and run from King's Cross to Perth, carrying J.K. Rowling, a consignment of books for her to sign and sell, also representatives of Bloomsbury and the press. The book was launched on 8 July 2000, on platform 1 at King's Cross – which had been given "Platform " signs for the occasion – following which the train departed. En route it called at Didcot Railway Centre, the Severn Valley Railway,  (overnight stop), Manchester, Bradford, the National Railway Museum (overnight stop), Newcastle, Edinburgh, arriving at Perth on 11 July. The locomotive was West Country class steam locomotive no. 34027 Taw Valley, which was specially repainted red for the tour; it later returned to its normal green livery (the repaints were requested and paid for by Bloomsbury). The coaches of the train included a sleeping car. The tour generated considerably more press interest than the launch of the film Thomas and the Magic Railroad which was premiered in London the same weekend.

Critical reception
Harry Potter and the Goblet of Fire has received mostly positive reviews. In The New York Times Book Review, author Stephen King stated the Goblet of Fire was "every bit as good as Potters 1 through 3" and praised the humour and subplots, although he commented that "there's also a moderately tiresome amount of adolescent squabbling...it's a teenage thing". Kirkus Reviews called it "another grand tale of magic and mystery...and clicking along so smoothly that it seems shorter than it is". However, they commented that it did tend to lag, especially at the end where two "bad guys" stopped the action to give extended explanations, and that the issues to be resolved in sequels would leave "many readers, particularly American ones, uncomfortable". For The Horn Book Magazine, Martha V. Parravano gave a mixed review, saying "some will find [it] wide-ranging, compellingly written, and absorbing; others, long, rambling, and tortuously fraught with adverbs". A Publishers Weekly review praised the book's "red herrings, the artful clues and tricky surprises that disarm the most attentive audience" and saying it "might be her most thrilling yet." Writing for The New Yorker, Joan Acocella noted that "where the prior volumes moved like lightning, here the pace is slower, the energy more dispersed. At the same time, the tone becomes more grim."

Kristin Lemmerman of CNN said that it is not great literature: 'Her prose has more in common with your typical beach-blanket fare and the beginning contained too much recap to introduce characters to new readers, although Rowling quickly gets back on track, introducing readers to a host of well-drawn new characters.' Writing for Salon.com, Charles Taylor was generally positive about the change of mood and development of characters. Entertainment Weekly reviewer Kristen Baldwin gave Goblet of Fire the grade of A−, praising the development of the characters as well as the many themes presented. However, she did worry that a shocking climax may be a "nightmare factory" for young readers.

In 2012 it was ranked number 98 on a list of the top 100 children's novels published by School Library Journal.

Awards and honours
Harry Potter and the Goblet of Fire won several awards, including the 2001 Hugo Award for Best Novel. It won the 2002 Indian Paintbrush Book Award, the third after Philosopher's Stone and Prisoner of Azkaban. The novel also won an Oppenheim Toy Portfolio Platinum Award for one of the best books, who claimed it was "more intense than the first three books". In addition, Entertainment Weekly listed Goblet of Fire in second place on their list of The New Classics: Books – The 100 best reads from 1983 to 2008. The Guardian ranked Harry Potter and the Goblet of Fire #97 in its list of 100 Best Books of the 21st Century.

Adaptations

Film

Harry Potter and the Goblet of Fire was adapted into a film, released worldwide on 18 November 2005, which was directed by Mike Newell and written by Steve Kloves. The film grossed $102.7 million for the opening weekend, and eventually grossed $896 million worldwide. The film was also nominated for Best Art Direction at the 78th Academy Awards.

Video game

It was also made into a video game for Microsoft Windows, PlayStation 2, Nintendo DS, GameCube, Xbox, Game Boy Advance, and PlayStation Portable by Electronic Arts. It was released just before the film.

References

External links

2000 British novels
2000 children's books
2000 fantasy novels
Bloomsbury Publishing books
British novels adapted into films
Fiction set in 1994
Fiction set in 1995
04
Hugo Award for Best Novel-winning works
Patricide in fiction
Sequel novels
Scholastic Corporation books
Children's fantasy novels